Jiří Háva (born 18 December 1944) is a Czech former cyclist. He competed in the individual road race at the 1972 Summer Olympics.

References

External links
 

1944 births
Living people
Czech male cyclists
Olympic cyclists of Czechoslovakia
Cyclists at the 1972 Summer Olympics
People from Třešť
Sportspeople from the Vysočina Region